Darussalam International Publishing & Distribution (also known as Dar-us-Salam in U.S) is a Saudi-based multilingual international publishing house operates in 35 countries. It's the second-largest publisher of translations of the Islamic scripture (Qur'ān) in the world after King Fahd Complex.

Notability
They published the first ever English language 'Islamic Studies' book series based on the syllabus framed by the UAE Ministry of Education & taught in school.

They published several books by historian Dr. Ali al-Sallabi

D&B estimated as a wholesaler, the Riyadh-based Darussalam International bookstore for publishing and distribution has a $1.43 million annual revenue & nearly 500 employee.

In March 2012, they published the first ever English language 'Prophetic Biography' as 11 volume Encyclopedia.  

In November 2020, after launching the Punjabi language translation they became the second-largest publisher of translations of the Islamic scripture (Qurʼān) in the world.

They are the 1st foreign private owned publishing company to have a partnership agreement with Dubai government's official media organization (DMI) to make Islamic scripture & Qurʼān available in more than 30 languages.

Major works
 Islamic Studies – (Grades 1-12) – 

 Dictionary of Islamic Terms (English-Arabic/Arabic-English) – 

 Arabic Course (3 Volume) – 

 Tafsir Ibn Kathir – English (10 Volume) – 

 Sahih Al-Bukhari – English (9 Volume) – 

The Noble Life Of The Prophet (3 volume) – 

 Fathul Bari Sharh Sahih Al-Bukhari (15 Vol Set) – 

 The Sealed Nectar (Ar Raheeq Al Makhtoum) – Color 1 7x24 – 

 Stories Of The Prophets In English – 
 The Last World – 
 Zakah according to Quran and Sunnah - Eng. – 
 An Inspiration to the World –

History
In the context of private owned Islamic scripture related printing, publishing in English language & distribution, they are the largest in the world.

They published more than 1600 Islamic books in various languages complying with international publishing standards, including 64 plus books on the life of the Islamic Prophet Muhammad. They also published the translation and interpretation of the Qur’an and other Islamic literature in 29 languages.

One of their notable projects was the first ever translation of six sahih hadith books into the English language, which comprises 38 volumes & containing 20,780 pages.

They follow Italian and Lebanese style printing standards & printed primarily in Lebanon, KSA, Italy and China. They also have a printing press in Pakistan. They have a team of scholars and researchers engaged in preparation of the academic plans and scriptures. To ensure originality and authenticity of the material being published, they have state-of-the-art research centers in Riyadh (KSA) and Lahore (Pakistan). They also have a network of Muslim Scholars around the globe, to double-check the script along with editorial guidelines of Research Center and approval of editorial board before publishing.

Growth and Expansion  
Darussalam began with a single retail outlet in KSA and eventually set up branches in over 17 countries with a distribution network worldwide.

Product Offerings  

Darussalam’s product offerings primarily consist of Quran and books on Islamic beliefs and teachings. On its website, they offer books in 20 categories.
 Quran
 Tafseer 
 Hadith
 Children 
 General
 Biography
 Hajj and Umrah
 Prayer/ Supplication
 Women
 Islamic Faith

Dtech system & Digital contents 
Along with printed books they also publish digital ebooks, Audiobooks on 
Amazon Kindle & Apple Books and have educational apps. It's the first Islamic publishing house in the Muslim world to digitalize its published books & provide varieties of digital learning material's. They have a subsidiary named “Dtech Systems” for this purpose. Its an IT & digital media company.

Darussalam provides educational devices to learn Qur’anic teachings through computer technology, most notably 'Baba Salam'. Its a mini-laptop (MLP), for kids to learn Quran, Supplications and other Islamic knowledge. They provide more than 30 such devices & the most popular among them are Digital Qur’an, The Teacher & Al Bayaan.

It claims to be the only institute who has made electronic devices and toys for the children to teach Islam in an easy way. They have 'Pen Qur’an' which made learning Quran easy & recite it without the need of an assistant. They provide a device named “Salatee (My Prayer)” to learn the prayer & The Dhuha International School – Ar-Riyadh has 
claimed to be appreciated this device because of its nominal price and easy to operate interface.

They provide digital educational devices, resource for student. easy-to-learn books for small children in attractive and colorful formats & the first whole Islamic studies series in English language covering all school grades (I- XII). They have more than 100 educative titles.

They have an eBook Library in collaboration with Islamic Online University which have a rich collection of books. It has some free stuff and one can try free trial period.

They have their own studio & have more than 500 audio, video products in English, Urdu language. They have also several books and packages especially designed for the new Muslims and non-Muslims for Dawah purpose. They also publish a magazine with the title 'Shining Star'.

References

Book publishing companies
Islamic publishing companies
Companies of Saudi Arabia

External links
Darussalam International (Official)
Darussalam Online Store for UK (Official)
Online Quran Classes For Kids (Official)